Aline Caroline de Rothschild, Lady Sassoon (21 October 1867 – 28 July 1909) was a French socialite and daughter of Cécile Anspach and Baron Gustave de Rothschild of the Rothschild family.

She was born in Paris, where her parents had a house on Avenue Marigny. In 1887, aged 19, she married Edward Sassoon (later Sir Edward Sassoon, 2nd Bt.) (1856–1912). They had two children:
Sir Philip Albert Gustave David Sassoon, 3rd Bt. (1888–1939)
Sybil Rachel Bettie Cécile, Marchioness of Cholmondeley (1894–1989)

Her great-great-grandson is actor Jack Huston.

See also
Rothschild banking family of France

References

English socialites
Aline Caroline de Rothschild
Aline Caroline de Rothschild
19th-century French Jews
1867 births
1909 deaths
Wives of baronets